Stenaliamorda fallax is a species of beetle in the family Mordellidae, the only species in the genus Stenaliamorda.

References

Beetles described in 1931
Mordellidae